Akeassia is a genus of flowering plants belonging to the family Asteraceae. It contains a single species, Akeassia grangeoides.

Its native range is Western Tropical Africa to South Sudan.

References

Astereae
Monotypic Asteraceae genera